Lontuecito Airport,  is an airstrip serving the Río Claro commune of the Maule Region in Chile.

See also

Transport in Chile
List of airports in Chile

References

External links
OpenStreetMap - Lontuecito
OurAirports - Lontuecito
FallingRain - Lontuecito Airport

Airports in Chile
Airports in Maule Region